Karl Walter Lillge (July 17, 1917 – April 17, 1994) was an American professional basketball player. He played for the Oshkosh All-Stars in the National Basketball League for three games during their 1939–40 season and averaged 0.7 points per game. Lillge also played in a number of independent leagues and in the Amateur Athletic Union.

References

1917 births
1994 deaths
Amateur Athletic Union men's basketball players
American men's basketball players
United States Army personnel of World War II
Basketball players from Wisconsin
Forwards (basketball)
Guards (basketball)
Lawrence University alumni
Military personnel from Wisconsin
Oshkosh All-Stars players
Sportspeople from Appleton, Wisconsin